Elyse Saugstad is an American professional free skier.  She was the 2008 Freeride World Champion.  Saugstad gained additional notoriety after surviving the 2012 Tunnel Creek avalanche.  She credits her survival to her use of an avalanche airbag that she deployed when the slide started.

References

American freeskiers
American female freestyle skiers
Living people
Year of birth missing (living people)